Saltese Creek is an approximately  long stream in Spokane County, Washington, United States. The stream now functions as one of two primary inflows (the other being Quinnamose Creek), as well as the primary outflow for the Saltese Flats (the residual wetlands of the drained lake). The stream has its headwaters near the summit of Mica Peak and terminates at Shelley Lake, which was created as a result of draining Saltese Lake.

References

Geography of Spokane, Washington
Rivers of Washington (state)
Rivers of Spokane County, Washington